Dahalik (ዳሃሊክ [haka (na)] dahālík, "[language (of)] the people of Dahlak"; also Dahaalik, Dahlik, Dahlak) is an Afroasiatic language spoken exclusively in the Dahlak Archipelago in Eritrea. Its speech area is off the coast of Massawa, on three islands in the Dahlak Archipelago: Dahlak Kebir, Nora, and Dehil.

Dahalik belongs to the Afro-Asiatic family's Semitic branch, a member of the Northern branch of the Ethiopic group, and is closely related to Tigre and Tigrinya. It is said to be not mutually intelligible with Tigre and, according to Simeone-Senelle, is sufficiently different to be considered a separate language. However, there are those who disagree.

Status 
Dahalik is spoken on the Dahlak Archipelago, an island group belonging to Eritrea in the Red Sea. On the archipelago, most people are speakers of Dahalik with smaller populations of Arabic and Afar native speakers. The situation is different for every village: Durrubishet and Dasquo have almost universal use of Dahalik, while other villages have a greater mix of languages. Most islanders are multilingual in Dahalik, Arabic, and Afar, while the language of education is Arabic. Most Dahalik men have regular contact with Arabic, Tigre, and Afar, and any mixed marriages usually result in the children learning two mother tongues. Dahalik speakers also consider their language to be a mix of Arabic, Tigre, and a small amount of Tigrinya. Overall, there are only a few elderly monolingual speakers of Dahalik. However, Dahalik speakers do have positive attitudes towards the language and see it as an essential part of their cultural identity.

Phonology

Vowels 
 might be another vowel. The vowel  only occurs in unstressed syllables.

Consonants 
Dahalik has 21 consonants.

 The velar fricative  and the voiced alveolar sibilant  are only used in loanwords from Arabic.

Morphology

Pronouns 
Dahalik has two different forms for second and third person pronouns, one masculine and one feminine.

Dahalik also has dependent (object) pronouns, suffixed to the end of the word.

Verbs 
The word order of a simple sentence in Dahalik is subject–object–verb. For conditional subordinate clauses, the subordinating marker ('if' or something similar) is at the end of the clause or just before the verb in the subordinating clause.

References

External links
 
Shaebia: Dahalik – Mysterious Tongue of the Dahlak Islands

Dahlak Archipelago
Languages of Eritrea
North Ethiopian Semitic languages